Sparganium americanum, American bur-reed, is a perennial plant found in the United States of America and Canada.  Though this species resembles a grass, it is a type of bur-reed.  This species is important for conservation purposes because it has the ability to remove nitrogen and phosphorus runoff from water, like many other wetland species.  By doing this it protects waterways from excess nitrogen which can cause eutrophication.  This increased nitrogen is especially a problem during the farmers’ growing season.  During this same time frame the S. americanum is growing and taking up nitrogen.

Distribution
Sparganium americanum is located in marshes.  American bur-reed grows from spring to fall in low marsh and shallow water (from 0 to 12 inches of water).
Sparganium americanum is located in the United States of America and Canada.  In the United States, American bur-reed is found in Alabama, Arkansas, Connecticut, Washington DC, Delaware, Florida, Georgia, Iowa, Illinois, Indiana, Kansas, Kentucky, Louisiana, Massachusetts, Maryland, Maine, Michigan, Missouri, Mississippi, North Carolina, North Dakota, New Jersey, New York, Ohio, Oklahoma, Pennsylvania, Rhode Island, South Carolina, Tennessee, Texas, Virginia, Vermont, Wisconsin, and West Virginia.  In Canada American bur-reed can be found in Manitoba, New Brunswick, Newfoundland, Nova Scotia, Ontario, Prince Edward, and Quebec.

Habitat and ecology
Sparganium americanum is a perennial plant.  American bur-reed grow in low marsh and shallow water, surviving in water up to 12 inches deep.  This species helps stabilize muddy areas.  Waterfowl and other animals feed on the seeds of S. americanum and some animals also eat their leaves.
Sparganium americanum live in peaty to sandy soils along lakeshores, slow moving streams and as floating vegetation in boggy lakes.
In a paper by the State University of New York at Binghamton, scientists showed that S. americanum accrued more aboveground biomass and lower belowground biomass than the other four wetland plant species the study looked at.  The study looked at Sparganium americanum, Phalaris arundinacea, Scirpus cyperinus, Juncus effusus, and Calamagrostis canadensis.  The study also showed that S. americanum had the highest concentration of nitrogen and phosphorus in aboveground tissue compared to the other species in the study.  Even though S. americanum accumulated the most aboveground nitrogen and phosphorus, this species lost so much phosphorus that its net retention dropped below that of other species in the study.  In the short run American bur-reed is helpful in retaining nutrients from agricultural runoff.

Waterfowl and marsh birds eat the seeds, and muskrats eat from the entire plant.

Morphology
Sparganium americanum is a monocot plant.  Individuals of this species may look like grass, but they aren’t.  Individual American bur-reeds can grow to be between two and four feet.  American bur-reed plants flower during the summer.  The leaves are green and are triangular in cross section; the leaves of individuals living in deeper water can produce floating leaves.

Flowers and fruit
Sparganium americanum spread rapidly through their underground root systems of rhizomes.  American bur-reed does flower in the summer time.  The inflorescence of S. americanum can be branched or simple.  The fruits of this plant species have a dull surface with beaks that are between 2 and 5 millimeters long.  These beaks may be straight, but some of them may be curved.  The flower tepals could have a dark spot on them.

References

americanum